Brent is an unincorporated community in Monroe County, in the U.S. state of Georgia.

History
The community was named after Thomas Y. Brent, an early settler. A post office called Brent was established in 1891, and remained in operation until 1904. A variant name was "Brent Crossroads".

References

Unincorporated communities in Monroe County, Georgia